The Silver City Water Works Building is a historic building located on Little Walnut Rd. in Silver City, New Mexico. The building was constructed in 1887 to provide Silver City with a municipal water system. While the city had established an electrical system and telegraph connections, it lacked reliable drinking water and a fire prevention system, as an earlier attempt to build a water system was never completed. George H. Utter obtained a contract to supply water to Silver City in 1886, and he commissioned Michigan stonemason John Hill to build the water works. The sandstone water works is the only sandstone building from the 1800s in Silver City, as brick was a much more common building material. While the water system opened and initially operated successfully, by 1890 Utter was accused of supplying undrinkable water and failing to meet the city's expectations for service. East Coast investors Henry and Thomas Foster took over the water works in the ensuing years after an extended legal battle with Utter.

The building was listed on the National Register of Historic Places in 1984.

See also

National Register of Historic Places listings in Grant County, New Mexico

References

Industrial buildings and structures on the National Register of Historic Places in New Mexico
Infrastructure completed in 1886
Water supply infrastructure on the National Register of Historic Places
Buildings and structures in Grant County, New Mexico
National Register of Historic Places in Grant County, New Mexico